Taylor Joseph Stallworth (born August 18, 1995) is an American football defensive tackle for the Houston Texans of the National Football League (NFL). He played college football at South Carolina, and was signed by the New Orleans Saints as an undrafted free agent in 2018.

Early life and high school
Stallworth was born and grew up in Mobile, Alabama and attended Murphy High School. As a junior, he registered 85 tackles and 10.5 sacks. He was named All-State and played in the Mississippi-Alabama All-Star game after recording 53 tackles, four sacks and 12 tackles for loss in his senior season. Stallworth committed to play college football at South Carolina over offers from Arkansas, Minnesota, Tennessee, Florida State, Georgia Tech, Kentucky, Vanderbilt, Southern Miss and Tulane.

College career
Stallworth played four seasons with the South Carolina Gamecocks, becoming a starter for the team during his sophomore year. As a junior, his first full year as a starter, Stallworth tallied 41 tackles (three for loss) and a sack. He made 30 tackles, including 2.5 for loss, and had two pass breakups as a senior. Over the course of his career Stallworth had 87 tackles, a sack and 12 quarterback hurries in 41 games (31 starts).

Professional career

New Orleans Saints 
Stallworth signed with the New Orleans Saints as an undrafted free agent on May 8, 2018. He made the Saints' 53-man roster out of training camp after a solid performance during the preseason. Taylor made his NFL debut on September 15, 2018 against the Cleveland Browns. He recorded his first career sack on November 29, 2018 in the Saints' 13-10 loss to the Dallas Cowboys. In his rookie season, Stallworth recorded eight tackles, a sack, and a fumble recovery in 14 regular season games played and five tackles and a QB hit in two playoff games.

Stallworth was waived by the Saints on September 17, 2019 but was re-signed to the team's practice squad two days later after clearing waivers. Stallworth was promoted back up to the active roster on December 16, 2019. He finished the season with eight tackles in four regular season games and one tackle in the Saints' Divisional Round Playoff game. He was waived on August 3, 2020.

Indianapolis Colts 
On August 10, 2020, Stallworth signed with the Indianapolis Colts. On January 10, 2021, Stallworth signed a one-year extension with the Colts.

Kansas City Chiefs 
Stallworth signed with the Kansas City Chiefs on April 5, 2022. He was waived on August 30, 2022 and signed to the practice squad the next day.  He was promoted to the active roster on October 12, 2022 but then was released on December 6, 2022.

Houston Texans
On December 7, 2022, Stallworth was claimed off waivers by the Houston Texans.

NFL statistics

References

External links
New Orleans Saints bio
South Carolina Gamecocks bio

1995 births
Living people
Sportspeople from Mobile, Alabama
Players of American football from Alabama
American football defensive tackles
South Carolina Gamecocks football players
New Orleans Saints players
Indianapolis Colts players
Kansas City Chiefs players
Houston Texans players